Horizon TV Asia is an Indian television Provider. It is a part of the wider Religious Program, a subsidiary of the Horizon TV Asia.

See also
 List of Indian television stations
 Zee Tv
 Faizabad

References

External links

Television stations in Delhi
Television stations in New Delhi
Television channels and stations established in 2015